The sixth season of Phillipine amateur singing competition Tawag ng Tanghalan, titled Tawag ng Tanghalan: Ika-anim na Taon, premiered on November 22, 2021, as a segment of the noontime variety television show It's Showtime.

From January 6 to 15, 2022, daily live production of It's Showtime was halted due to the surge of COVID-19 cases caused by the Omicron variant. The season resumed on January 17, 2022.

Changes 
The mechanics for the daily rounds for this season were modified. In the first round, dubbed as "Battle of Versions," daily contenders perform the same song with their renditions. The winners of the first round advance to the second round, dubbed as the "Face Off," where contestants perform a song of their choice to snatch the golden microphone from the defending champion. The champion who defends their title five times advances to the quarterfinals, whereas reaching the eighth time automatically grants them a place in the semifinals.

Hosts and judges 
Vhong Navarro, Vice Ganda, Amy Perez, and Kim Chiu reprised their roles as hosts, with Karylle, Ion Perez, Ogie Alcasid and Jackie Gonzaga as the rotating fifth co-host. Anne Curtis and Jhong Hilario both returned to their hosting duties in May and June after their respective hiatuses.

Ryan Bang reprised his role as gong master with substitutes Jameson Blake and Maymay Entrata, and Jugs Jugueta and Teddy Corpuz appeared in past roles occasionally.

Jugueta, Corpuz and Perez returned as backstage hosts.

Louie Ocampo, Ogie Alcasid, Zsa Zsa Padilla, Erik Santos, Klarisse de Guzman, Nyoy Volante, Jed Madela, Karylle, Yeng Constantino, Kyla, Angeline Quinto and Jolina Magdangal returned as judges for the sixth season. Marco Sison and Darren Espanto joined the judging panel on November 1, 2022 and February 21, 2023 respectively. 

Randy Santiago, Rey Valera, and K Brosas did not return due to their commitments to Sing Galing.
Past judges Karla Estrada, Gary Valenciano, Mitoy Yonting may return later in the season.

Prizes 
The defending champion receives  while the losing contenders receive .

Quarter I

Daily Rounds 
Color Key:
 
Contender's Information:

Results Details:

Italicized names denotes a contender is a resbaker

Ryan Ayangco (Luzon), who became a defending champion on January 3, 2022, withdrew from the competition the next day due to health 
reasons. Patricia Ivy Peñano (Luzon), who became a defending champion on January 4, 2022, also withdrew from the competition on the next week due to health reasons. They both returned on March 12, 2022.

{| class="wikitable mw-collapsible mw-collapsed" style="text-align:center; width:100%;"
|+ style="background-color:#fff291;font-size:14px" |Week 15 (February 28 to March 5, 2022)

! rowspan="2" width="07%" |Day
! colspan="5" |Battle of Versions
! rowspan="2" width="10%" |Hurados
! rowspan="2" width="12%" |Hosts
! rowspan="2" width="05%" |Gong
 
|-
! width="15%"  colspan=2|Contender
 
! width="13%" |Song
! width="05%" |Score
! width="05%" |Result
|-
! rowspan="5" |Monday

!style="background-color:#CE1126;"|
|style="background:#44ff77;"|Murline Uddin
| rowspan="2" style="background:#___;"|"Halik"
|style="background:#44ff77;"|89.3%
|style="background:#44ff77;"|Advanced
| rowspan="5" |Ogie Alcasid
 
Erik Santos
 
Kyla
| rowspan="5" |Vhong NavarroVice GandaAmy PerezKim Chiu
| rowspan="5" |Jugs Jugueta
|-
!style="background-color:#CE1126;"|
|style="background:pink;"|Katrina Casia
|style="background:pink;"|89.0%
|style="background:pink;"|Eliminated
|-
! colspan="5" |Face-off
|-
!style="background-color:#CE1126;"|
|style="background:pink;"|Murline Uddin
|style="background:pink;"|"Ang Buhay Ko"
|style="background:pink;"|90.7%
|style="background:pink;"|Eliminated
|-
!style="background-color:#FCD116;"|
|style="background:#FFFDD0;"|Ryle Coloma
|style="background:#FFFDD0;"|"You"
|style="background:#FFFDD0;"|92.0%
|style="background:#FFFDD0;"|Defending Champion
|-
! colspan="12" style="background:#555;"|
|-

! rowspan="2" width="07%" |Day
! colspan="5" |Battle of Versions
! rowspan="2" width="10%" |Hurados
! rowspan="2" width="12%" |Hosts
! rowspan="2" width="05%" |Gong
 
|-
! width="15%"  colspan=2|Contender
 
! width="13%" |Song
! width="05%" |Score
! width="05%" |Result
|-
! rowspan="5" |Tuesday

!style="background-color:#FCD116;"|
|style="background:#44ff77;"|King Boy Eugenio
| rowspan="2" style="background:#___;"|"Ikaw Lang"
|style="background:#44ff77;"|89.3%
|style="background:#44ff77;"|Advanced
| rowspan="5" |Louie Ocampo
 
Erik Santos
 
Kyla
| rowspan="5" |Vhong NavarroVice GandaKim Chiu
| rowspan="5" |Teddy Corpuz
|-
!style="background-color:#FCD116;"|
|style="background:pink;"|Mary Joy Ponada
|style="background:pink;"|89.0%
|style="background:pink;"|Eliminated
|-
! colspan="5" |Face-off
|-
!style="background-color:#FCD116;"|
|style="background:#FFFDD0;"|King Boy Eugenio
|style="background:#FFFDD0;"|"Magasin"
|style="background:#FFFDD0;"|93.3%
|style="background:#FFFDD0;"|Defending Champion
|-
!style="background-color:#FCD116;"|
|style="background:azure;"|Ryle Coloma
|style="background:azure;"|"Sana"
|style="background:azure;"|92.3%
|style="background:azure;"|Selected for Resbakbakan Week
|-
! colspan="12" style="background:#555;"|
|-

! rowspan="2" width="07%" |Day
! colspan="5" |Battle of Versions
! rowspan="2" width="10%" |Hurados
! rowspan="2" width="12%" |Hosts
! rowspan="2" width="05%" |Gong
 
|-
! width="15%"  colspan=2|Contender
 
! width="13%" |Song
! width="05%" |Score
! width="05%" |Result
|-
! rowspan="5" |Wednesday

!style="background-color:#8deb87;"|
|style="background:#44ff77;"|Roel Arbon
| rowspan="2" style="background:#___;"|"Balong Malalim"
|style="background:#44ff77;"|94.0%
|style="background:#44ff77;"|Advanced
| rowspan="5" |Ogie Alcasid
 
Erik Santos
 
 Kyla
| rowspan="5" |Vhong NavarroVice GandaAmy PerezKim Chiu
| rowspan="5" |Ryan Bang
|-
!style="background-color:#0038A8;"|
|style="background:pink;"|Eiderlyn Tecson
|style="background:pink;"|92.7%
|style="background:pink;"|Eliminated
|-
! colspan="5" |Face-off
|-
!style="background-color:#8deb87;"|
|style="background:#FFFDD0;"|Roel Arbon
|style="background:#FFFDD0;"|"Hanggang"
|style="background:#FFFDD0;"|92.7%
|style="background:#FFFDD0;"|Defending Champion
|-
!style="background-color:#FCD116;"|
|style="background:pink;"|King Boy Eugenio
|style="background:pink;"|"Tadhana"
|style="background:pink;"|91.7%
|style="background:pink;"|Eliminated
|-
! colspan="12" style="background:#555;"|
|-

! rowspan="2" width="07%" |Day
! colspan="5" |Battle of Versions
! rowspan="2" width="10%" |Hurados
! rowspan="2" width="12%" |Hosts
! rowspan="2" width="05%" |Gong
 
|-
! width="15%"  colspan=2|Contender
 
! width="13%" |Song
! width="05%" |Score
! width="05%" |Result
|-
! rowspan="5" |Thursday

!style="background-color:#FCD116;"|
|style="background:#44ff77;"|Aero Arro
| rowspan="2" style="background:#___;"|"Kung Di Rin Lang Ikaw
|style="background:#44ff77;"|91.7%
|style="background:#44ff77;"|Advanced
| rowspan="5" |Ogie Alcasid
 
Jed Madela
 
 Kyla
| rowspan="5" |Vhong NavarroVice GandaAmy PerezKim Chiu
| rowspan="5" |Jugs Jugueta
|-
!style="background-color:#FCD116;"|
|style="background:pink;"|Avegail Joy Erpelo
|style="background:pink;"|89.7%
|style="background:pink;"|Eliminated
|-
! colspan="5" |Face-off
|-
!style="background-color:#FCD116;"|
|style="background:pink;"|Aero Arro
|style="background:pink;"|"Binibini"
|style="background:pink;"|91.7%
|style="background:pink;"|Eliminated
|-
!style="background-color:#8deb87;"|
|style="background:#FFFDD0;"|Roel Arbon
|style="background:#FFFDD0;"|"Nais Ko"
|style="background:#FFFDD0;"|92.7%
|style="background:#FFFDD0;"|Defending Champion
|-
! colspan="12" style="background:#555;"|
|-

! rowspan="2" width="07%" |Day
! colspan="5" |Battle of Versions
! rowspan="2" width="10%" |Hurados
! rowspan="2" width="12%" |Hosts
! rowspan="2" width="05%" |Gong
 
|-
! width="15%"  colspan=2|Contender
 
! width="13%" |Song
! width="05%" |Score
! width="05%" |Result
|-
! rowspan="5" |Friday

!style="background-color:#0038A8;"|
|style="background:pink;"|Kyle Lagunsay
| rowspan="2" style="background:#___;"|"Babalik Kang Muli"
|style="background:pink;"|90.7%
|style="background:pink;"|Eliminated
| rowspan="5" |Ogie Alcasid
 
Jed Madela
 
Kyla
| rowspan="5" |Vhong NavarroVice GandaAmy PerezKim Chiu
| rowspan="5" |Teddy Corpuz
|-
!style="background-color:#8deb87;"|
|style="background:#44ff77;"|Lee'Anna Layumas
|style="background:#44ff77;"|91.3%
|style="background:#44ff77;"|Advanced|-
! colspan="5" |Face-off
|-
!style="background-color:#8deb87;"|
|style="background:#FFFDD0;"|Lee'Anna Layumas|style="background:#FFFDD0;"|"With a Smile"|style="background:#FFFDD0;"|93.3%|style="background:#FFFDD0;"|Defending Champion|-
!style="background-color:#8deb87;"|
|style="background:azure;"|Roel Arbon
|style="background:azure;"|"Ngayong Nandito Ka"
|style="background:azure;"|91.7%
|style="background:azure;"|Selected for Resbakbakan Week
|-
! colspan="12" style="background:#555;"|
|-

! rowspan="2" width="07%" |Day
! colspan="5" |Battle of Versions
! rowspan="2" width="10%" |Hurados
! rowspan="2" width="12%" |Hosts
! rowspan="2" width="05%" |Gong
 
|-
! width="15%"  colspan=2|Contender
 
! width="13%" |Song
! width="05%" |Score
! width="05%" |Result
|-
! rowspan="5" |Saturday

!style="background-color:#FCD116;"|
|style="background:#44ff77;"|Ryan Sabacco| rowspan="2" style="background:#___;"|"Mapa"
|style="background:#44ff77;"|93.3%|style="background:#44ff77;"|Advanced| rowspan="5" |Ogie Alcasid 
Jed Madela
 
 Kyla
| rowspan="5" |Vhong NavarroVice GandaAmy PerezKim Chiu
| rowspan="5" |Ryan Bang
|-
!style="background-color:#0038A8;"|
|style="background:pink;"|Ann Doplon
|style="background:pink;"|91.7%
|style="background:pink;"|Eliminated
|-
! colspan="5" |Face-off
|-
!style="background-color:#FCD116;"|
|style="background:azure;"|Ryan Sabacco
|style="background:azure;"|"Cool Off"
|style="background:azure;"|92.0%
|style="background:azure;"|Selected for Resbakbakan Week
|-
!style="background-color:#8deb87;"|
|style="background:#FFFDD0;"|Lee'Anna Layumas|style="background:#FFFDD0;"|"How Did You Know"|style="background:#FFFDD0;"|93.3%|style="background:#FFFDD0;"|Defending Champion|-
! colspan="12" style="background:#555;"|
|-
|}

 Quarter II 

 Daily Rounds Color Key: Contender's Information:Results Details:Italicized names denotes a contender is a resbaker

Alfred Bogabil (Luzon), who became a daily winner on May 30, 2022, withdrew on the Face Off Round due to health reasons.

 Quarter III

 Daily Rounds Color Key: Contender's Information:Results Details:Italicized names denotes a contender is a resbaker

 Quarter-finals 
This format is similar to the Quarter Finals of season 5. The quarter finalists are scored of the following criteria: Voice quality (50%) and Overall performance (50%).

 Quarter I 
The 8 Quarter Finalists (now 7), will compete in a head to head battle. They had the power to choose the song of their competitor from a random selection of songs of their opponents. The Top 2 Quarter Finalists with the highest scores at the end of the week will move on to the semifinals and will receive . The First Quarter Finals week aired on April 4—9, 2022.

Eufritz Santos (Metro Manila) from fifth season, who withdrew at that time due to health reasons, will compete in  Quarter I Quarter Finals Week.

Querubin Llavore (Mindanao) did not perform in the competition due to health reasons, but she will return in the next quarter finals.

 Daily Rounds Results Details Quarter II 
The 8 Quarter Finalists, will compete in a head to head battle. It follows the same mechanics of the First Quarter Finals Week. They had the power to choose the song of their competitors from a random selection of songs of their opponents. The Top 2 Quarter Finalists with the highest scores at the end of the week will move to the Semifinals and will receive . A consolation prize of  will be given to quarter finalists who failed to advance to the next round. The Second Quarter Finals Week was aired on October 10–15, 2022.

Querubin Llavore (Mindanao), did not perform in the competition, but she will compete in Quarter II Resbakbakan Week.

 Daily Rounds Results Details Final Results Contender's InformationResults Details Resbakbakan 

 Summary of ResbakersColor Key:Results Details:Color Key: Quarter I 
The 12 Resbakers, (six daily winners, three 2-time defending champions and three 4-time defending champions), divided into two groups of six will perform their redemption songs. The Top 3 Resbakers on Monday and Tuesday will advance on Wednesday. The Final 6 Resbakers will compete for 2 rounds and the Top 3 Resbakers will have the chance to advance to get the Top 2 spots for the Ultimate Resbak Week.Results Details Quarter II 
The 12 Resbakers, (three daily winners, two 1-time defending champions, two 2- time defending champions, two 3-time defending champions, two 4-time defending champions and one Quarterfinalist), will perform their redemption songs in a head to head battle. The remaining 6 Resbakers will compete in a head to head battle again. The Top 4 Resbakers will get the chance to advance to get the Top 2 spots for the Ultimate Resbak Round.Results Details Semifinals 

 Summary of Semifinalists Contender's InformationResults Details Elimination table Color Key:Results Details'''

 Notable contestants 
Quarter I
JR Oclarit competed in Bombo Music Festival 2019, where he won as the grand champion of the competition.
Christian Imperial recently competed in Sing Galing.
Eden Broqueza recently competed in Sing Galing.
Jazzne Kier joined in third season of I Can See Your Voice as one of the mystery singers.
Noriecel Bejasa was a participant of Will To Win, a former segment of Wowowin. She also recently competed in Sing Galing.
Clarreazze Wepingco joined in Tawag ng Tanghalan Kids, but she lost. She returned in fourth season of Tawag ng Tanghalan, and won as the defending champion before the COVID-19 pandemic. She also joined in Lola's Playlist, a former segment of Eat Bulaga!.
Panky Trinidad was a grand finalist in the first season of Pinoy Dream Academy and finished in fourth place.
Rea Gen Villarreal joined in second season of Tawag ng Tanghalan, but she lost. She returned in fourth season, and became a 3-time defending champion but she lost to Clarreazze Wepingco.
Ronnie Velasco recently competed in Sing Galing.
Victoria Ingram joined in Kanta Pilipinas, but she lost. She also joined in Rising Stars Philippines and finished in fifth place.
Diego Arroyo auditioned on the second season of The Voice Kids, under the screen name, Alain Diego Arroyo, but he did not get any of the coaches turn their chairs during the Blind Auditions.
Jherome Alias joined in third season of I Can See Your Voice as one of the mystery singers.
CJ Garcia auditioned on the fifth season of Pilipinas Got Talent, as the lead vocalist of  the band Next Option wherein their group finished in twelfth place.
Shenna Minque won as daily winner in second season of Tawag ng Tanghalan, but she lost to Ignacio Ondoy.
Aihna Imperial joined in Tawag ng Tanghalan Kids, but she lost. She also auditioned on the second season of The Voice Kids and joined Team Lea, but she was eliminated in the battles.
Patricia Ivy Peñano joined in first season of I Can See Your Voice as one of mystery singers.
Maryum Alindogan was a participant of BuwayArtista, a former segment of Lunch Out Loud.
Reign Basa was a 3-time defending champion in Tawag ng Tanghalan Kids, under the screen name, Reign Curthney Basa, but she lost to Kiefer Sanchez. She returned in the Ultimate Resbak Round, but she lost to John Cedric Ramirez.
Calvin Candelaria auditioned on the second season of The Voice Teens, and joined Team apl.de.ap. He became one of the Top 3 grand finalists, but he lost to Isang Manlapaz who eventually won as one of the grand champions of the season.
Lady Mhalec Ramento was a participant of Will To Win, a former segment of Wowowin.
Ronald Perilla recently competed in Sing Galing.
Chantal Salonga joined in Kanta Pilipinas, but she lost.
Sophia David joined in first season of Tawag ng Tanghalan, but she lost. She returned in third season, but she lost again.
Andrei Lunar auditioned on the second season of The Voice Teens, but he did not get any of the coaches turn their chairs during the Blind Auditions.
Antonetthe Tismo auditioned on the third season of The Voice Kids and joined Team Sharon. She became one of the Top 3 grand finalists and placed as the runner up to Joshua Oliveros who eventually won as the grand champion of the season. She also recently competed in the second season of The Clash, as one of the Top 12 contenders and finished in fifth place.
Querubin Llavore won as daily winner in first season of Tawag ng Tanghalan, but she lost to Mary Gidget Dela Llana. She returned in third season, but she lost twice in Quarter 1 and Quarter 4 respectively.
Kristel Budomo joined in second season of Tawag ng Tanghalan, but she lost. She returned in third season, and won as daily winner but she lost to Elaine Duran who eventually won as the grand champion of the season.
Khalil Tambio joined in third season of I Can See Your Voice as one of the mystery singers.
Nowi Alpuerto joined in Your Moment as a member of the singing trio Alpuerto Sisters, but they were eliminated in the second level on the singing category. They also recently competed in the fifth season of Talentadong Pinoy wherein their group became one of the Hall of Fame contenders.
Jian Albert Doyog won as daily winner in third season of Tawag ng Tanghalan, but he lost to Marco Adobas.
Ralph Mariano was a defending champion in third season of Tawag ng Tanghalan, but he lost to Clyde Borongan.
Pearly Jean Apurador won as daily winner in third season of Tawag ng Tanghalan, but she lost to Jonas Oñate.
Rhevynies Encinares joined in Lola's Playlist, a former segment of Eat Bulaga!.
Lady Lyn Datu was a participant of Willie of Fortune, a former segment of Wowowin. She also recently competed in Sing Galing.
Maxine Abliter auditioned on the second season of The Voice Teens, under the screen name, Max Abliter, but she did not get any of the coaches turn their chairs during the Blind Auditions.
Julz Bahala is a member of Pinopela, a Filipino a capella group together with Tawag ng Tanghalan fifth season third placer Anthony Castillo.
Ryle Coloma joined in second season of Tawag ng Tanghalan, under the screen name, Daryl Coloma, but he lost. He returned in third season, and won as daily winner but he lost to Jophil Cece.
Avegail Joy Erpelo was a defending champion in second season of Tawag ng Tanghalan, but she lost to JM Joven.
Lee'Anna Layumas was a participant of Will To Win, a former segment of Wowowin. She also joined in Just Duet, a former segment of Eat Bulaga!. She also joined in Rising Stars Philippines and finished in third place. She also recently competed in Sing Galing.
Ryan Sabacco joined in the first season of Born to Be a Star. He also auditioned on the first season and second season of Pilipinas Got Talent, as the lead vocalist of Kapidamu Band, but they were eliminated in the semifinals for two consecutive seasons.
Edel Quibol joined in second season of Tawag ng Tanghalan, under the screen name, Edel Mae Quibol, but she lost.
Hana Adriano auditioned on the second season of The Voice Teens, and joined Team Sarah, but she was stolen by Team apl.de.ap in the battles. She was eliminated in the Knockouts to Isang Manlapaz who eventually won as one of the grand champions of the season.
Caila Raquion won as daily winner in first season of Tawag ng Tanghalan, but she lost to Marco Diolata. She returned in second season, under the screen name, Caila Nicole Raquion, but she lost again.
Sharlene Casihan joined in first season of Tawag ng Tanghalan, but she lost. She returned in second season, but she lost again.
Justin Reolada participated in the World Championship of Performing Arts (WCOPA) where he won multiple medals. He also was a participant of Willie of Fortune, a former segment of Wowowin.
Aradel Bascruz auditioned on the third season of The Voice Kids and joined Team Sharon, but she was eliminated in the battles. She also joined in Your Moment, as a member of the singing group Glitters, but they were eliminated in the third level on the singing category.
Ardy Talima recently competed in Sing Galing.
Mandy Sevillana auditioned on the second season of The Voice Kids and joined Team Sarah, but she was eliminated in the battles. She also joined in MiniMe, a former segment of It's Showtime. She also joined in Tawag ng Tanghalan Kids, but she lost. She returned in the Ultimate Resbak Round, but she lost to Lift John Demonteverde.
Lloyd Sarausos won as daily winner in second season of Tawag ng Tanghalan, but he lost to Anton Antenorcruz in Quarter 2. He returned in Quarter 4, but he lost. He returned again in third season, and won again as daily winner but he lost to Rose Ganda Sanz. He also recently competed in the second season of The Clash, as one of the Top 64 contenders, but he lost to Janina Gonzales. He also joined in Duet with Me, a former segment of Studio 7.
Pia Banga auditioned on the second season of The Voice Teens and joined Team Lea, but she was stolen by Team Sarah in the battles. She was eliminated in the Knockouts to Jay Lloyd Garche.
Benjamen Bandol was a weekly finalist in Tawag ng Tanghalan: New Normal, but he lost to Mara Tumale.
Trixie Dayrit won as daily winner in first season of Tawag ng Tanghalan, but she lost to Lendon Zuñiga. She was also a weekly finalist in Tawag ng Tanghalan: New Normal, but she lost to Mara Tumale.
Wilson Buerano joined in third season of Tawag ng Tanghalan, but he lost.
Quarter II
Odet Ojascastro joined in ReIna ng Tahanan, a former segment of It's Showtime. She also joined in fourth season of I Can See Your Voice as one of the mystery singers.
Airene Bautista participated in the World Championship of Performing Arts (WCOPA) where she won multiple medals. She also auditioned on the second season of The Voice Teens and joined Team Lea, but she was eliminated in the Knockouts to Kristian Rajagopal.
John Van Lapu won as daily winner in second season of Tawag ng Tanghalan, under the screen name, Jhon Van Lapu, but he lost to Boyet Onte. He also auditioned on the second season of The Voice Teens and joined Team Sarah, but he was eliminated in the Knockouts to Andre Parker.
Elleaine Cuadra was a weekly finalist in Tawag ng Tanghalan: New Normal, but she lost to Shan Dela Vega and Rommel Arellano.
Zillah Cabarles joined in second season of Tawag ng Tanghalan, but she lost.
Rox Omilda is a member of Pinopela, a Filipino a capella group together with Tawag ng Tanghalan fifth season third placer Anthony Castillo.
Albert Aguilar was a participant of KanTrabaho, a former segment of Lunch Out Loud.
Jizzel Bordones won as daily winner in third season of Tawag ng Tanghalan, but she lost to Jhannah Mae Blances.
Vincent Gregorio auditioned on the second season of The Voice Teens and joined Team Bamboo, but he was eliminated in the Knockouts to Rock Opong.
Renz Robosa won as daily winner in third season of Tawag ng Tanghalan, under the screen name, Renz Ruther Robosa, but he lost to Windimie Yntong. He also joined in first season of I Can See Your Voice as one of the mystery singers. He also joined in Bet ng Bayan and finished in third place on the singing category. He also recently competed in the third season of The Clash, as one of the Top 12 contenders and finished in fifth place.
Shanen Garciso recently competed in the second season of The Clash, as one of the Top 32 contenders, but she lost to Jennifer Maravilla.
Segie Arlos joined in second season of Tawag ng Tanghalan, but he lost.
Mylene Lopena joined in second season of I Can See Your Voice as one of mystery singers.
Edgardo Arrieta Jr. auditioned on the sixth season of Pilipinas Got Talent, but he was eliminated in the Judges Cull Round. He also was a participant of KanTrabaho, a former segment of Lunch Out Loud.
Kaye Panopio joined in first season of Tawag ng Tanghalan, under the screen name, Kaye Julien Panopio, but she lost. She also recently competed in Sing Galing.
Aly Fabellar auditioned on the second season of The Voice Teens and joined Team Bamboo, but she was eliminated in the Knockouts to Heart Salvador who eventually won as one of the grand champions of the season.
Derf Cabael auditioned on the fifth season of Pilipinas Got Talent, but he was eliminated in the semifinals. He also recently competed in Sing Galing.
Genesis Guiwan recently competed in Sing Galing.
Reynaldo Osorio Jr. won as daily winner twice in third season of Tawag ng Tanghalan, but he lost to Jonas Oñate in Quarter 3 and Niña Jaro in Quarter 4 respectively.
Dave Alcano joined in first season of Tawag ng Tanghalan, but he lost twice in Quarter 1 and Quarter 3 respectively. He also joined in first season of I Can See Your Voice as one of the mystery singers.
Abegail Sellote recently competed in the first season of The Clash, as one of the Top 32 contenders, but she lost to Lyra Micolob. She also recently competed in Sing Galing.
Audrey Malaiba joined in first season of Tawag ng Tanghalan, but she lost. She returned in third season, and became a 2-time defending champion but she lost to Elaine Duran who eventually won as the grand champion of the season. She returned in the Instant Resbak Week, but she lost to Shaina Mae Allaga. She returned again in the Final Resbak Week, but she lost to Kim Nemenzo. She also joined in Tawag ng Tanghalan: All-Star Grand Resbak, but she lost to Dior Lawrence Bronia and Jessica Alarcon in the Four Way Battle Round. She was also a semifinalist in the WishCovery segment of Wish 107.5.
Zyra Cajandab auditioned on the first season of The Voice Teens, under the screen name, Zyra Peralta and joined Team Sharon, but she was eliminated in the Knockouts to Christy Lagapa. She also recently competed in Sing Galing.
Jennifer Panaligan joined in first season of Tawag ng Tanghalan, but she lost. She was also a weekly finalist in Tawag ng Tanghalan: New Normal, but she lost to Wincel Portugal Maglanque.
Arvin Jay Daño joined in third season of Tawag ng Tanghalan, but he lost.
Edimar Bonghanoy joined in third season of Tawag ng Tanghalan, but he lost. He returned in fourth season, and won as daily winner but he lost to Paulette Cambronero.
Melody Hodgson joined in KalokaLike, a former segment of It's Showtime.
Marko Rudio joined in second season of Tawag ng Tanghalan, but he lost. He also joined in Music Hero, a former segment of Eat Bulaga!.
Danica Pascual joined in first season of Tawag ng Tanghalan, but she lost.
John Vince Deiparine won as daily winner in third season of Tawag ng Tanghalan, but he lost to Shantal Cuizon.
April Valde joined in Music Hero, a former segment of Eat Bulaga!.
RJ Dagapioso joined in first season of Tawag ng Tanghalan, but he lost.
Erwin Sagaysay joined in third season of Tawag ng Tanghalan, but he lost.
John Wayne Dela Rosa recently competed in Sing Galing.
Andrew Verzosa recently competed in Sing Galing.
Angela Noveno recently competed in the first season of The Clash, as one of the Top 32 contenders, but she lost to Miriam Manalo.
Jayvee Jaucian joined in Tawag ng Tanghalan: New Normal, but he lost to Brian Constantinopla.
Elizabeth Leyba was a grand finalist in the second season of Tagisan ng Galing and placed as the runner up to Karl Aris Tanhueco who eventually won as the grand champion of the season on the singing category.
Klarylle May Dumancas joined in Tawag ng Tanghalan Kids, but she lost.
Rash Bleir Hinggosa recently competed in the third season of The Clash, under the screen name, Rash Almazan, as one of Top 20 contenders, but he lost in the Five Way Battle Round.
Chin Chin Abellanosa was a 3-time defending champion in first season of Tawag ng Tanghalan, under the screen name, Rossgene Abellanosa, but she lost to Rosarely Avila in Quarter 1. She returned in Quarter 3 and won as daily winner, but she lost to Antonio Sabalza.
Dan Billano joined in fourth season of Tawag ng Tanghalan, but he lost. He also auditioned on the first season of The Voice of the Philippines and joined Team Bamboo, but he was eliminated in the battles. He also became one of the Songbees in The Singing Bee.
Xylein Chen Herrera auditioned on the third season of The Voice Kids and joined Team Bamboo, but she was eliminated in the semifinals to Justin Alva.
Nelson Batula was a weekly finalist in Tawag ng Tanghalan: New Normal, but he lost to Mara Tumale.
Jezza Quiogue won as daily winner in Tawag ng Tanghalan Kids, under the screen name, Jezza Mae Quiogue, but she lost to Francis Concepcion.
Jo Pasaron was a weekly finalist in fifth season of Tawag ng Tanghalan, under the screen name, Jomar Pasaron, but he lost to Reiven Umali who eventually won as the grand champion of the season. He also auditioned on the first season of The Voice Teens and joined Team Lea, but he was eliminated in the battles.
Raven Heyres joined in fourth season of I Can See Your Voice as one of the mystery singers.
Sydney Alipao joined in third season of Tawag ng Tanghalan, but she lost. She also joined in fourth season of I Can See Your Voice as one of the mystery singers.
Johndel Djaliul won as daily winner in fourth season of Tawag ng Tanghalan, but he lost to Luzviminda Piedad.
Bea Sacramento joined in first season of Tawag ng Tanghalan, but she lost. She returned in fifth season, and won as daily winner but she lost to Lorraine Galvez and Anthony Castillo. She also recently competed in the first season of  The Clash, as one of the Top 62 contenders, but she lost to Alliyah Cadeliña.
Pedro Adriano was a defending champion in third season of Tawag ng Tanghalan, under the screen name, Jethro Adriano, but he lost to JLou Florentino.
Tanniah Ylagan won as daily winner in fifth season of Tawag ng Tanghalan, but she lost to Claire Maaba and Pamela Anne Mulimbayan. She also joined in the first season of Born to Be a Star.
Neil Santos was a participant of Willie of Fortune, a former segment of Wowowin.
Von Martino joined in first season of Tawag ng Tanghalan, but he lost. He returned in third season, but he lost again. He also joined in Tawag ng Tanghalan: New Normal, but he lost to Paolo Onesa.
Mike Luna joined in first season of Tawag ng Tanghalan, but he lost. He also was a participant of KanTrabaho, a former segment of Lunch Out Loud.
Meleena Santos was a 2-time defending champion in second season of Tawag ng Tanghalan, under the screen name, Mara Santos, but she lost to Lalaine Araña. She returned in third season, and became a defending champion again but she lost to Marlou Flores. She also joined in first season of I Can See Your Voice as one of the mystery singers.
Michael Esguerra recently competed in Sing Galing.
Anne Raz joined in fifth season of Tawag ng Tanghalan, but she lost. She also recently competed in the first season of The Clash, as one of the Top 62 contenders, but she lost to Garrett Bolden.
Josephine Aton won as daily winner in first season of Tawag ng Tanghalan, but she lost to Jessa Montefalcon in Quarter 1. She returned in Quarter 3 and became a defending champion, but she lost to Edzel Ryan Herrera. She also auditioned on the first season of Pilipinas Got Talent, but she was eliminated in the semifinals.
Ernest Jude Lebrilla was a weekly finalist in fifth season of Tawag ng Tanghalan, but he lost to Gem Cristian.
Borge Rivera auditioned on the first season of The Voice Kids and joined Team Bamboo, but he was eliminated in the sing-offs.
Paul Abellana auditioned on the second season of The Voice Kids and joined Team Bamboo, but he was eliminated in the battles to Elha Nympha who eventually won as the grand champion of the season.
Jonalyn Pepito joined in second season of Tawag ng Tanghalan, but she lost. She also auditioned on the second season of The Voice Kids and joined Team Lea, but she was eliminated in the sing-offs.
Chito Ricafrente won as daily winner in first season of Tawag ng Tanghalan, under the screen name, Ramoncito Ricafrente, but he lost to Jaime Navarro in Quarter 1. He returned in Quarter 3, but he lost. He returned again in third season, but he lost again. He also was a grand finalist in the second season of Tagisan ng Galing and finished in second place on the singing category.
Anna Marie Ricafrente was a weekly finalist in Tawag ng Tanghalan: New Normal, but she lost to Wincel Portugal Maglanque.
Maxell Muldez joined in first season of Tawag ng Tanghalan, under the screen name, Maxell Joseph Muldez, but he lost.
Villier Villalobo joined in Bida Kapamilya, a former segment of It's Showtime.
Datu Kent Icalina recently competed in Sing Galing.
Paula Macalalad was a 3-time defending champion in third season of Tawag ng Tanghalan, but she lost to Edward Paul Mapula. She returned in fifth season, and became a 2-time spotlight champion but she lost to Kyle Pasajol.
Shamae Mariano was a 4-time spotlight champion in fifth season of Tawag ng Tanghalan, but she lost to Rafaella Berso.
Aisa Aguilar joined in fourth season of Tawag ng Tanghalan, but she lost.
Aira Asuncion was a 3-time spotlight champion in fifth season of Tawag ng Tanghalan, under the screen name, Aira Kris Asuncion, but she lost to Christian David Davao.
Jayda Bue joined in Tawag ng Tanghalan Kids, under the screen name, Jayda Russell Bue, but she lost.
Romeo Ramos joined in KalokaLike, a former segment of It's Showtime. He also was a participant of KanTrabaho, a former segment of Lunch Out Loud.
Recelle Ordas joined in first season of Tawag ng Tanghalan, but she lost. She returned in second season, and won as daily winner but she lost to Charles Kevin Tan. She returned again in fifth season, but she lost again. She also was a participant of KanTrabaho, a former segment of Lunch Out Loud.
Julian Juangco joined in fifth season of Tawag ng Tanghalan, but he lost. He also auditioned on the first season of The Voice Teens and joined Team Lea, but he was eliminated in the Knockouts to Chan Millanes.
Karl Tanhueco was a 2-time defending champion in third season of Tawag ng Tanghalan, under the screen name, Karl Aris Tanhueco, but he lost to Rhea Alondra Velarde in Quarter 1. He returned in Quarter 3 and became a 2-time defending champion again, but he lost to Christian Biando. He also auditioned on the second season of The Voice of the Philippines and joined Team Lea, but he was eliminated in the battles to Nino Alejandro. He also joined in the second season of Tagisan ng Galing and eventually won as the grand champion of the season on the singing category.
Dre Eusebio auditioned on the second season of The Voice Teens, under the screen name, Andre Eusebio, and joined Team Sarah, but he was stolen by Team Lea in the battles. He was eliminated in the Knockouts to Alexia Tag-at.
Riolyn Tuhay won as daily winner in third season of Tawag ng Tanghalan, but she lost to Pearl Ray Ogue.
Alyssa Del Sol joined in fifth season of Tawag ng Tanghalan, but she lost. She also joined in the surprise prank episode of Jhong Hilario on June 4, 2022.
JC Laborte was a monthly finalist in the Wishcovery segment of Wish 107.5.
Sherrie Igne joined in first season of Tawag ng Tanghalan, but she lost. She returned in fifth season, and won as daily winner but she lost to Everod Bancifra and Rogelio Colanggo.
Diadelyn Tano recently competed in Sing Galing.
Claire Siggaoat auditioned on the second season of The Voice Teens and joined Team Bamboo, but she was eliminated in the battles to Heart Salvador who eventually won as one of the grand champions of the season.
Lovely Restituto was a spotlight champion in fifth season of Tawag ng Tanghalan, under the screen name, Lovely Ann Restituto, but she lost to Reiven Umali who eventually won as the grand champion of the season. She also recently competed in the fourth season of The Clash, as one of the Top 12 contenders and finished in fourth place.
Gyweneth Ravago joined in third season of Tawag ng Tanghalan, but she lost. She returned in fifth season, and became a 2-time spotlight champion but she lost to Rogelio Colanggo.
Kelvin Silvestre won as daily winner in first season of Tawag ng Tanghalan, but he lost to Lucky Robles.
Jarea Ifurung joined in second season of Idol Philippines, but she was eliminated in the Solo Round.
Raymund Mahusay joined in fourth season of Tawag ng Tanghalan, but he lost.
Reymar Parame joined in Tawag ng Tanghalan: New Normal, but he lost to Marlo Falcon.
Arvie Centeno joined in Tawag ng Tanghalan: New Normal, but he lost to Glenford Gamilde.
Quarter III
Jayper Palma was a weekly finalist in Tawag ng Tanghalan: New Normal, but he lost to Mark Anthony Castro.
Anj Galias recently competed in Sing Galing.
Omar Escobar joined in fourth season of Tawag ng Tanghalan, but he lost.
Kimberly Baculo was a platinum ticket holder in second season of Idol Philippines, but she was eliminated in the Solo Round.
Reynan Dal-Anay auditioned on the second season of The Voice Kids and joined Team Lea. He became one of the Top 4 grand finalists and placed as runner up to Elha Nympha who eventually won as the grand champion of the season.
Trisha Estrella was a defending champion in third season of Tawag ng Tanghalan, but she lost to Jannine Cartagena. She returned in fifth season, but she lost.
Jayson Padua joined in third season of Tawag ng Tanghalan, but he lost.
Bimmy de Guia joined in fifth season of Tawag ng Tanghalan, but she lost. She also joined in first season of I Can See Your Voice as one of the mystery singers.
Joshua Madrid joined in second season of Tawag ng Tanghalan, but he lost. He returned in fourth season, and became a 2-time defending champion but he lost to Arlene Cagas.
Edzel Ryan Herrera was a defending champion in first season of Tawag ng Tanghalan, but he lost to Rochelle Solquillo in Quarter 3. He returned in Quarter 4 and became a defending champion again, but he lost to Carlmalone Montecido.
Jessa Mae Gallemaso was a semifinalist in fourth season of Tawag ng Tanghalan. She returned in  the Final Resbak Week, but she lost to Rachell Laylo.
Angelika de Guzman won as daily winner in third season of Tawag ng Tanghalan, under the screen name, A.K. de Guzman, but she lost to JLou Florentino. She also joined in second season of Born to Be a Star. She also joined in second season of Idol Philippines, but she was eliminated in the Group Round.
Dharrel Monsirat joined in first season of I Can See Your Voice as one of the mystery singers. He also joined in the second season of Tagisan ng Galing, but he was eliminated in the Wildcard Round on the singing category.
Juleannah Louise won as daily winner in fifth season of Tawag ng Tanghalan, under the screen name, Juleannah Gayares, but she lost to Enrico Villaruz and Jem Aba.
Zeek Sevilla was a weekly finalist in Tawag ng Tanghalan: New Normal, but he lost to Evelyn Grace Martinez. He also participated in the World Championship of Performing Arts (WCOPA) where he won multiple medals.
Elreamae Baliguat won as daily winner in fourth season of Tawag ng Tanghalan, under the screen name, Elreamae Sobretodo, but she lost to Micoline Acedera.
Jesselli Balasabas won as daily winner in fourth season of Tawag ng Tanghalan, but she lost to Arlene Cagas.
Arnelli Balasabas won as daily winner in first season of Tawag ng Tanghalan, but she lost to Eva Castillo.
Avegail Quiapo joined in fifth season of Tawag ng Tanghalan, but she lost.
Venisse Nicole Sy joined in first season of Tawag ng Tanghalan, but she lost. She also was a weekly finalist in Tawag ng Tanghalan: New Normal, but she lost to Wincel Portugal Maglanque. She also joined in first season of I Can See Your Voice as one of the mystery singers.
Kyle Ralvin won as daily winner in third season of Tawag ng Tanghalan, under the screen name, Kyle Pasajol, but he lost to Charizze Arnigo. He returned in fifth season, and became a spotlight champion but he lost to Al Fritz Blanche. He also recently competed in the third season of The Clash, as one of the Top 16 contenders, but he lost to Princess Vire. He also joined in the surprise prank episode of Jhong Hilario on June 4, 2022. 
Jejuara Dane Tiplan recently competed in Sing Galing.
Roque Belino joined in fourth season of Tawag ng Tanghalan, but he lost. He also joined in first season of Idol Philippines, but he was eliminated in the Solo Round.
Mhariecella Solano won as daily winner in third season of Tawag ng Tanghalan, but she lost to Marco Adobas.
Jayren Sy was a weekly finalist in Tawag ng Tanghalan: New Normal, but she lost to Mich Primavera.
Katherine San Antonio joined in third season of Tawag ng Tanghalan, but she lost.
Christian Cayobit joined in second season of Tawag ng Tanghalan, but he lost. He also participated in the World Championship of Performing Arts (WCOPA) where he won multiple medals.
Chingkie Maylon was a 3-time defending champion in third season of Tawag ng Tanghalan, but he lost to Emil Sinagpulo in Quarter 2. He returned in Quarter 4 but he was gonged by Louie Ocampo.
Justine Ortega joined in second season of Idol Philippines, but he was eliminated in the Do or Die Round.
Via Samantha Mojado joined in fifth season of Tawag ng Tanghalan, but she lost. She also recently competed in Protégé: The Battle for the Big Break, but she was eliminated in the Face Off Round.
Al Lipaopao was a spotlight champion in fifth season of Tawag ng Tanghalan, but he lost to Jhoas Sumatra.
Lecelle Olario joined in third season of Tawag ng Tanghalan, but she lost.
Aya Rimando won as daily winner in fifth season of Tawag ng Tanghalan, but she lost to John Rex Baculfo and Faye Yupano.
MC Mateo joined in third season of Tawag ng Tanghalan, under the screen name, Maria Cerina Mateo, but she lost. She also was a participant of Willie of Fortune, a former segment of Wowowin.
Caloy Quemada recently competed in Sing Galing.
Kenneth Enriquez won as daily winner in fourth season of Tawag ng Tanghalan, but she lost to Arlene Cagas.
Tombi Romulo joined in fifth season of Tawag ng Tanghalan, but she lost. She also recently competed in second season of The Clash, as one of the Top 12 contenders and finished in eleventh place.
Sarci Polea recently competed in Sing Galing.
Alexis Ramirez joined in Tawag ng Tanghalan: New Normal, but she lost to Ramesis Macabenta.
Kaloi Lejera joined in first season of Tawag ng Tanghalan, under the screen name, John Karl Lejera, but he lost.
Jessmar Calayaan joined in first season of Tawag ng Tanghalan, but he lost. He returned in second season, and won as daily winner but he lost to Arbie Baula. He returned again in fourth season, but he lost again.
Dan Ryan Jawad joined in fourth season of Tawag ng Tanghalan, but he lost.
Karl Dingle won as daily winner in fifth season of Tawag ng Tanghalan, under the screen name, John Karl Dingle, but he lost to Aira Kris Asuncion and Eufritz Santos.
Naomigene Pajanostan recently competed in  Sing Galing.
Marianet Sanchez joined in Tawag ng Tanghalan: New Normal, but she lost to Marlyn Salas.
Juvanesa Plaza won as daily winner in third season of Tawag ng Tanghalan, but she lost to Chad Binoya. She returned in fifth season, but she lost.
Ralph Angelo Merced joined in first season of Tawag ng Tanghalan, but he lost. He also joined in Kanta Pilipinas, but he lost.
Ericka Uychiat won as daily winner in first season of Tawag ng Tanghalan, under the screen name, Ericka Joy Uychiat, but she lost to Arnel Mendoza. She returned in fourth season, but she lost.
Braggy Caguineman was a participant of BuwayArtista, a former segment of Lunch Out Loud.
Larnie Cayabyab won as daily winner in fourth season of Tawag ng Tanghalan, but she lost to Rea Gen Villarreal. She recently competed in the third season of The Clash, as one of the Top 12 contenders and finished in sixth place. She also joined in Oras Mo Na, a former segment of TiktoClock.
Leanne Layague joined in Tawag ng Tanghalan Kids, under the screen name, Leanne Joy Layague, but she lost.
Lyka Estrella joined in first season of Tawag ng Tanghalan, under the screen name, Christine Lyka Estrella, but she lost. She returned in third season, and won as daily winner but she lost to Emil Sinagpulo. She returned again in fourth season, but she lost again.
Mhegz Nav won as daily winner in third season of Tawag ng Tanghalan, under the screen name, Rossini Navarro, but she lost to Elaine Duran who eventually won as the grand champion of the season. She also recently competed in Sing Galing.
Trix Corpez was a 2-time spotlight champion in fifth season of Tawag ng Tanghalan, but he lost to Ara Bautista. He also joined in first season of Idol Philippines, but he was eliminated in the Do or Die Round.
Sarah Veronica Flores joined in fourth season of Tawag ng Tanghalan, under the screen name, Sarah Flores, but she lost. She also joined in Kanta Pilipinas, but she lost.
Dhenber Lapuz was a defending champion in second season of Tawag ng Tanghalan, but he lost to Avegail Joy Erpelo.
Jun Dinopol joined in third season of Tawag ng Tanghalan, but he lost.
Ricca Bernardo recently competed in Sing Galing.
Ragen Anne Peñaflor won as daily winner in third season of Tawag ng Tanghalan, but she lost to Ranillo Enriquez. She also auditioned on the third season of The Voice Kids, under the screen name, Ragen Angel Peñaflor, and joined Team Lea, but she was eliminated in the semifinals to Joshua Oliveros who eventually won as the grand champion of the season. She also participated in the World Championship of Performing Arts (WCOPA) where she won multiple medals.
Mary Joy Villas joined in third season of Tawag ng Tanghalan, but she lost.
Jonar Rementizo was a 3-time defending champion in third season of Tawag ng Tanghalan, but she lost to Mariel Panillion.
Bennie Satona joined in first season of Tawag ng Tanghalan, but he lost.
Akie Erika Cedilla won as daily winner in second season of Tawag ng Tanghalan, but he lost to Lalaine Araña in Quarter 1. He returned in Quarter 4 but he lost. He also joined in Your Moment, as a member of the singing trio Lez 2 Men, wherein their group finished in third place on the singing category. He also was a participant of KanTrabaho, a former segment of Lunch Out Loud.
Yannilyn Magsayo was a defending champion in third season of Tawag ng Tanghalan, but she lost to Chingkie Maylon.
Niña Jaro won as daily winner in third season of Tawag ng Tanghalan, but she lost to Audrey Malaiba in Quarter 1. She returned in Quarter 4 and became a 3-time defending champion but she lost to Virginia Salazar.
Rowell Quizon joined in third season of Tawag ng Tanghalan, but he lost. He also auditioned on the third season of Pilipinas Got Talent, but he was eliminated in the semifinals. He also recently competed in the second season of The Clash, as one of the Top 64 contenders, but he lost to Jun Sisa.
Mark Cordovales auditioned on the first season of The Voice of the Philippines and joined Team Bamboo, as a member of Cordovales Duo, but he was eliminated in the battles to Paolo Onesa. He also joined in first season of Idol Philippines, but he did not advance to the Idol City''.

References 
Notes

Scores

Sources

Tawag ng Tanghalan seasons
2021 Philippine television seasons
2022 Philippine television seasons
2023 Philippine television seasons